The Chinese Historical Society of America (abbreviated CHSA) is the oldest and largest archive and history center documenting the Chinese American experience in the United States. It is based in the Chinatown neighborhood of San Francisco, California.

Exhibitions

The CHSA Museum features the set of twelve Gum Shan paintings by Jake Lee which were originally commissioned for a private dining room in Johnny Kan's eponymous restaurant, which opened in 1959. The museum also has on permanent display the large mural One Hundred Years: History of the Chinese in America by James Leong, commissioned for the Ping Yuen Housing Project in the early 1950s.

History
The CHSA was conceived in the fall of 1962 and incorporated on January 5, 1963, founded by Thomas W. Chinn, C.H. Kwock, Chingwah Lee, H.K. Wong, and Thomas W.S. Wu D.D.S. The five challenged the accepted history that excluded the contribution of Chinese immigrants to building California and the West Coast.

The first permanent headquarters for the CHSA were a small building on Adler Place, which also was used as a museum.

Chinatown YWCA
In 1916, the first Chinatown YWCA branch was established in a former saloon at Stockton and Sacramento; the San Francisco YWCA passed a resolution in October 1929 to build a new facility on three adjacent lots bounded by Joice, Clay, and Powell. Noted architect Julia Morgan was contracted to design the now-historic building, and after consultation with Chinese-Americans, included cultural elements from Chinese arts and crafts. The building housed the Chinatown branch of the YWCA from 1932 until it was damaged in the 1989 Loma Prieta earthquake; the board of the YWCA decided to sell the building to the CHSA in 1996 with the help of Supervisor Tom Hsieh and Mayor Willie Brown.

In November 2001 the CHSA relocated and opened the Chinese Historical Society of America Museum and Learning Center in the Chinatown YWCA building. The National Trust for Historic Preservation awarded the CHSA its National Preservation Honor Award in 2004 for its work restoring and retrofitting the 1932 building, nicknamed the "Lantern on the Hill". In 2005, CHSA received another award from the California Heritage Council for its restoration of the YWCA building .

See also

Chinese American Museum
Chinese Culture Center
Chinese Historical Society of Southern California
History of Chinese Americans in San Francisco
Museum of Chinese in America
Weaverville Joss House State Historic Park
List of San Francisco Designated Landmarks

References

External links
Chinese Historical Society of Southern California

Chinese-American museums in California
Chinatown, San Francisco
Historical society museums in California
Museums in San Francisco
Organizations based in San Francisco
Museums established in 1963
San Francisco Designated Landmarks
Julia Morgan buildings